Arm is a British semiconductor and software design company based in Cambridge, England.
Its primary business is in the design of ARM processors (CPUs). It also designs other chips, provides software development tools under the DS-5, RealView and Keil brands, and provides systems and platforms, system-on-a-chip (SoC) infrastructure and software. As a "holding" company, it also holds shares of other companies. Since 2016, it has been owned by Japanese conglomerate SoftBank Group.

While ARM CPUs first appeared in the Acorn Archimedes, a desktop computer, today's systems include mostly embedded systems, including ARM CPUs used in virtually all modern smartphones. Processors based on designs licensed from Arm, or designed by licensees of one of the ARM instruction set architectures, are used in all classes of computing devices. Arm has two lines of graphics processing units (GPUs), Mali, and the newer Immortalis (which includes hardware-based ray-tracing).

Arm's main CPU competitors in servers include IBM, Intel and AMD.
Intel competed with ARM-based chips in mobile, but Arm no longer has any competition in that space (however, vendors of actual ARM-based chips compete within that space). Arm's main GPU competitors include mobile GPUs from American and Japanese technology companies Imagination Technologies (PowerVR), Qualcomm (Adreno), and increasingly Nvidia, AMD, Samsung and Intel. While competing in GPUs, Qualcomm, Samsung and Nvidia all have combined their GPUs with Arm-licensed CPUs.

Arm had a primary listing on the London Stock Exchange (LSE) and was a constituent of the FTSE 100 Index. It also had a secondary listing of American depository receipts on New York's NASDAQ. However Japanese multinational conglomerate SoftBank Group made an agreed offer for Arm on 18 July 2016, subject to approval by Arm's shareholders, valuing the company at £24.3 billion. The transaction was completed on 5 September 2016. A planned takeover deal by Nvidia, announced in 2020, collapsed as of February 2022, with SoftBank subsequently announcing that Arm planned to raise billion through an IPO on the NASDAQ in 2023, rather than the LSE.

History

Name
The acronym ARM was first used in 1983 and originally stood for "Acorn RISC Machine". Acorn Computers' first RISC processor was used in the original Acorn Archimedes and was one of the first RISC processors used in small computers. However, when the company was incorporated in 1990, what 'ARM' stood for changed to "Advanced RISC Machines", in light of the company's name "Advanced RISC Machines Ltd" and according to an interview with Steve Furber the name change was also at the behest of Apple, which did not wish to have the name of a former competitor namely Acorn in the name of the company.  At the time of the IPO in 1998, the company name was changed to "ARM Holdings", often just called ARM like the processors.

On 1 August 2017, the styling and logo were changed. The logo is now all lowercase ('arm') and other uses of the name are in sentence case ('Arm') except where the whole sentence is upper case, so, for instance, it became 'Arm Holdings', and since only Arm.

Founding
The company was founded in November 1990 as Advanced RISC Machines Ltd and structured as a joint venture between Acorn Computers, Apple, and VLSI Technology.  Acorn provided 12 employees, VLSI provided tools, Apple provided $3 million investment.  Larry Tesler, Apple VP was a key person and the first CEO at the joint venture. The new company intended to further the development of the Acorn RISC Machine processor, which was originally used in the Acorn Archimedes and had been selected by Apple for its Newton project. Its first profitable year was 1993. The company's Silicon Valley and Tokyo offices were opened in 1994. ARM invested in Palmchip Corporation in 1997 to provide system on chip platforms and to enter into the disk drive market. In 1998, the company changed its name from Advanced RISC Machines Ltd to ARM Ltd. The company was first listed on the London Stock Exchange and NASDAQ in 1998 and by February 1999, Apple's shareholding had fallen to 14.8%.

In 2010, ARM joined with IBM, Texas Instruments, Samsung, ST-Ericsson (since dissolved) and Freescale Semiconductor (now NXP Semiconductors) in forming a non-profit open source engineering company, Linaro.

Acquisitions and divestments

1999
 Micrologic Solutions, a software consulting company based in Cambridge

2000
 Allant Software, a developer of debugging software
 Infinite Designs, a design company based in Sheffield
 EuroMIPS a smart card design house in Sophia Antipolis, France

2001
 The engineering team of Noral Micrologics, a debug hardware and software company based in Blackburn, England

2003
 Adelante Technologies of Belgium, creating its OptimoDE data engines business, a form of lightweight DSP engine

2004
 Axys Design Automation, a developer of ESL design tools and Artisan Components, a designer of physical IP (intellectual property: standard cell libraries, memory compilers, PHYs etc.), the building blocks of integrated circuits

2005
 KEIL Software, a leading developer of software development tools for the microcontroller (MCU) market, including 8051 and C16x platforms. ARM also acquired the engineering team of PowerEscape.

2006
 Falanx (now called ARM Norway), a developer of 3D graphics accelerators
 SOISIC, who specialise in developing silicon-on-insulator physical IP

2011
 Obsidian Software Inc., a privately held company that creates processor verification products
 Prolific, a developer of automated layout optimisation software tools, and the Prolific team will join the ARM physical IP team

2013
 Internet of Things startup Sensinode
 Cadence's PANTA family of high-resolution display processor and scaling coprocessor IP cores (formerly developed in Evatronix)

2014
 PolarSSL, a software library implementing the SSL and TLS protocols. (In February 2015, PolarSSL has been rebranded to mbed TLS to better show its fit inside the mbed ecosystem.)
 Duolog Technologies, an electronic design automation company that developed a suite of tools that automate the process of IP configuration and IP integration

2015
 Sansa Security, a provider of hardware security intellectual property (IP) and software for advanced system-on-chip components deployed in Internet of Things (IoT) and mobile devices
 Wicentric, a Bluetooth Smart stack and profile provider
 Sunrise Micro Devices, a provider of sub-one volt Bluetooth radio intellectual property (IP)
 Offspark, a provider of IoT security software
 Carbon Design Systems, a provider of cycle-accurate virtual prototyping solutions
 On 19 November, ARM, alongside Cisco Systems, Dell, Intel, Microsoft, and Princeton University, founded the OpenFog Consortium, to promote interests and development in fog computing.

2016
 Apical, a provider of imaging and embedded computer vision IP products
 Allinea Software, a leading provider of software tools for HPC

2018
 Treasure Data ($600 million acquisition), provides enterprise data management software for device-to-data IoT platform
 Stream Technologies, provides connectivity management platform and GSM connectivity

2020
 In July 2020, Arm announced plans to spin off Treasure Data, together with the other parts of its "IoT Services Group" business, into separate SoftBank-owned entities by the end of September 2020.

Changes of ownership

Japanese conglomerate SoftBank Group made an agreed offer for ARM on 18 July 2016, subject to approval by ARM's shareholders, valuing the company at £23.4 billion (US$32 billion). The transaction was completed on 5 September 2016.

In 2017, a 25 percent stake of Arm was transferred to the SoftBank Vision Fund, which received investment from the Saudi sovereign fund.

American technology company Nvidia announced plans on 13 September 2020 to acquire ARM from SoftBank, pending regulatory approval, for a value of US$40 billion in stock and cash, which would have been the largest semiconductor acquisition to that date. SoftBank Group will acquire slightly less than a 10% stake in Nvidia, and ARM would maintain its headquarters in Cambridge. There is opposition to the deal, for several reasons, including national security concerns from the UK and competition concerns from fellow tech companies such as Google, Microsoft and Qualcomm, whose chips in use or on sale heavily rely on Arm's intellectual property. It is also being battled by Arm China, its subsidiary, of which majority stake is held by the Chinese funds. The acquisition was initially scheduled to conclude before the end of 2022 per the contract. However, the European Commission, the UK Competition and Markets Authority and the US Federal Trade Commission raised completion concerns focusing on Arm's role within Nvidia, while the UK government also raised concerns about national security. The merger attempt was eventually cancelled in February 2022 due to the aforementioned regulatory pressure and hurdles.

Row over ownership of Arm China 
Softbank Group sold more than half of Arm China in 2018 to a local consortium consisting of various parties including China Investment Corp. and the Silk Road Fund, effectively relinquishing the majority ownership of the Chinese subsidiary to a group of investors who have ties to Beijing. Since 2020, discord between Arm and the effective owners of Arm China became visible after the British parent company unsuccessfully tried to oust the chief executive of the subsidiary, who still kept his position regardless. A prevailing view emerged that the matter would negatively affect the pending approval by the Chinese regulators over the Softbank-Nvidia deal, as well as a public offering of Arm.

As of September 2021, despite Arm's denial, some reports observed that the chief executive of Arm China, whom the British parent had tried to dismiss, had publicly declared the "independence" of Arm China. In February 2022, Allen Wu, the CEO of Arm China, floated an idea of a public offering of the Chinese subsidiary itself in no sooner than 2025 as a possibility.

On 29 April 2022, it was reported that the CEO and legal representative of Arm China had finally been replaced according to legally recognized filings.

Operations
Unlike most traditional microprocessor suppliers, such as Intel, Freescale (the former semiconductor division of Motorola, now NXP Semiconductors) and Renesas (a former joint venture between Hitachi and Mitsubishi Electric), ARM only creates and licenses its technology as intellectual property (IP), rather than manufacturing and selling its own physical CPUs, GPUs, SoCs or microcontrollers. This model is similar to those of fellow British design houses ARC International and Imagination Technologies, which have similarly been designing and licensing GPUs, CPUs, and SoCs, along with supplying tooling and various design and support services to their licensees.

Technology
A characteristic feature of Arm processors is their low electric power consumption, which makes them particularly suitable for use in portable devices.

Arm processors are used as the main CPU for most mobile phones many PDAs and handhelds, like the Apple iPod and iPad, and computer games and as well as many other applications, including GPS navigation devices, digital cameras and televisions.

Arm supercomputers
The world's second fastest supercomputer (previously fastest), the Japanese Fugaku is based on Arm AArch64 architecture.

The supercomputer maker Cray has added "ARM Option" (i.e. CPU blade option, using Cavium ThunderX2) to their XC50 supercomputers, and Cray claims that ARM is "a third processor architecture for building next-generation supercomputers", for e.g. the US Department of Energy.

Fujitsu (the supercomputer maker of June 2011 world's fastest K computer according to TOP500) announced at the International Supercomputing Conference in June 2016 that its future exascale supercomputer will feature processors of its own design that implement the ARMv8 architecture, rather than the SPARC processors used in earlier supercomputers. These processors will also implement extensions to the ARMv8 architecture equivalent to HPC-ACE2 that Fujitsu is developing with ARM Holdings.

The Cray XC50-series supercomputer for the University of Bristol is called Isambard, named after Isambard Kingdom Brunel. The supercomputer is expected to feature around 160 nodes, each with two 32-core ThunderX2 processors running at 2.1 GHz. Peak theoretical performance of the 10,240 cores and 40,960 threads is 172 teraFLOPS.

The Vanguard project by Sandia National Laboratories is to deliver an exascale ARM machine. The first generation was called Hammer, it was based on X-Gene by Applied Micro. The second generation was called Sullivan was based Cavium's ThunderXs processors. The third generation of the Sandia National Laboratories' Vanguard project called Mayer was based on pre-production ThunderX2. The fourth generation also based on ThunderX2 is called Astra and was slated to become operational by November 2018.

Neuromorphic technology
ARM968E-S was used to build the neuromorphic supercomputer, SpiNNaker (Spiking Neural Network Architecture).

Products
Arm offers several microprocessor core designs that have been "publicly licensed" for its newer "application processors" (non-microcontroller) used in such applications as smartphones and tablets. Three of those companies are known to have a licence for one of Arm's 64-bit Cortex-A72 (some including ARM's other 64-bit core the Cortex-A53).

Cores for ARMv8.2-A include the Cortex-A77, Cortex-A65AE, Cortex-A76, Cortex-A75 and Cortex-A55. Cores for ARMv8-A include the Cortex-A73, Cortex-A72, Cortex-A32, Cortex-A35, Cortex-A57 and Cortex-A53. ARM's client roadmap includes Hercules in 2020 and Matterhorn in 2021.

Cores for 32-bit architectures include Cortex-A32, Cortex-A15, Cortex-A12, Cortex-A17, Cortex-A9, Cortex-A8, Cortex-A7 and Cortex-A5, and older "Classic ARM Processors", as well as variant architectures for microcontrollers that include these cores: Cortex-R7, Cortex R5, Cortex-R4, Cortex-M35P, Cortex-M33, Cortex-M23 Cortex-M7, Cortex-M4, Cortex-M3, Cortex-M1, Cortex-M0+, and Cortex-M0 for licensing.

Licensees
Companies often license these designs from Arm to manufacture and integrate into their own System on chip (SoC) with other components such as GPUs (sometimes Arm's Mali) or modem/radio basebands (for mobile phones). Arm offers multiple licensing programs for their cores. Arm also offers Artisan POP IP, where Arm partners with foundries to provide physical implementation, which allows faster time to market.

In February 2016, Arm announced the Built on Arm Cortex Technology licence often shortened to Built on Cortex (BoC) licence. This licence allows companies to partner with Arm and make modifications to Arm Cortex designs. These design modifications will not be shared with other companies. These semi-custom core designs also have brand freedom, for example Kryo 280.

In addition to licences for their core designs and BoC licence, Arm offers an "architectural licence" for their instruction set architectures, allowing the licensees to design their own cores that implement one of those instruction sets. An Arm architectural licence is more costly than a regular Arm core licence.

Uses of Arm technology
Processors based on designs licensed from Arm, or designed by licensees of one of the ARM instruction set architectures, are used in all classes of computing devices (including in space). Processors designed by Arm or by Arm licensees are used as microcontrollers in embedded systems, including real-time safety systems (cars' ABS), biometrics systems (fingerprint sensor), smart TVs (e.g. Android TV), all modern smartwatches (such as Qualcomm Toq), and are used as general-purpose processors in smartphones, tablets, laptops, desktops (even for running traditional x86 Microsoft Windows programs), servers and supercomputers/HPC,

Systems, including iPhone smartphones, frequently include many chips, from many different providers, that include one or more licensed Arm cores, in addition to those in the main Arm-based processor. Arm's core designs are also used in chips that support many common network-related technologies in smartphones: Bluetooth, WiFi and broadband, in addition to corresponding equipment such as Bluetooth headsets, 802.11ac routers, and network providers' cellular LTE.

Partnerships

University of Michigan
In 2011, Arm renewed a five-year, US$5 million research partnership with University of Michigan, which extended their existing research partnership to 2015. This partnership would focus on ultra-low energy and sustainable computing.

Arduino
In October 2017, Arduino announced its partnership with ARM. The announcement said, in part, "ARM recognized independence as a core value of Arduino ... without any lock-in with the ARM architecture." Arduino intends to continue to work with all technology vendors and architectures.

Intel
In October 2018, ARM Holdings partnered with Intel in order to share code for embedded systems through the Yocto Project.

Mbed OS
On 20 October 2018, Arm unveiled Arm Mbed OS, an open source operating system for IoT. On 8 October 2019, Arm announced a new Partner Governance model for partners to collaborate on the future roadmap. Partners include: Analog Devices, Cypress, Maxim Integrated, Nuvoton, NXP, Renesas, Realtek, Samsung, Silicon Labs and u-blox.

Autonomous Vehicle Computing Consortium (AVCC)
On 8 October 2019, Arm announced the Autonomous Vehicle Computing Consortium (AVCC) to collaborate and accelerate development of self-driving cars. Members include Arm, Bosch, Continental, Denso, General Motors, Nvidia, NXP and Toyota.

Defense Advanced Research Projects Agency (DARPA)
In August 2020, Arm signed a three-year agreement with DARPA, the US Defense Advanced Research Projects Agency, enabling DARPA researchers to use all of Arm's commercially available technology.

Senior management
In October 2001, Warren East was appointed chief executive officer (CEO) of Arm Holdings. In the 2011 financial year, East received a total compensation of £1,187,500 from ARM, comprising a salary of £475,000 and a bonus of £712,500.

In May 2013, president Simon Segars took over as CEO.

In March 2014, former Rexam chairman Stuart Chambers succeeded John Buchanan as chairman. Chambers, a non-executive director of Tesco and former chief executive of Nippon Sheet Glass Group, had previously worked at Mars and Royal Dutch Shell.

On 8 February 2022, Rene Haas succeeded Segars as CEO with immediate effect, with Segars leaving Arm.

Current leadership
 Chair: Stuart Chambers (since March 2014)
 Chief Executive: Rene Haas (since February 2022)

List of former chairpersons
 Sir Robin Saxby (2001–2006)
 Doug Dunn (2006–2012)
 Sir John Buchanan (2012–2014)

List of former chief executives
 Sir Robin Saxby (1991–2001)
 Warren East (2001–2013)
 Simon Segars (2013–2022)

References

External links

 

 
1990 establishments in England
1998 initial public offerings
2016 mergers and acquisitions
Acorn Computers
Apple Inc. partnerships
Companies based in Cambridge
Electronics companies established in 1990
British companies established in 1990
Companies formerly listed on the London Stock Exchange
Semiconductor companies of the United Kingdom
Fabless semiconductor companies
HSA Foundation founding members
Softbank portfolio companies
Multinational joint-venture companies
British subsidiaries of foreign companies